Cabane may refer to:

Cabane de l'A Neuve, mountain hut in the Swiss Alps at 2,735 meters above sea level
Cabane de Saleina, mountain hut in the Swiss Alps at 2,691 meters above sea level
Cabane du Trient, mountain hut in the Swiss alps near the Swiss town of Martigny and the French town of Chamonix
Cabane Giovanni Gnifetti, refuge in the Alps in Aosta Valley, Italy
Cabane Reine Marguerite, mountain hut belonging to the Italian Alpine Club, on the Signalkuppe of Monte Rosa in the Alps
Cabane strut of a biplane aircraft supports the upper wing over the fuselage

People with the surname
Bernard Cabane, French scientist, director in the French National Center for Scientific Research (CNRS)
Olivia Fox Cabane, American author, public speaker, and the co-founder of Kindearth.tech

See also
Caban (disambiguation)
Cabanes (disambiguation)
Cabannes (disambiguation)